The Valderøy Tunnel is a subsea road tunnel which runs between the islands of Ellingsøya (in Ålesund Municipality) and Valderøya (in Giske Municipality) in Møre og Romsdal county, Norway. It was built in 1987 as part of the Vigra Fixed Link project. It was a toll road until 25 October 2009.

References

Subsea tunnels in Norway
Road tunnels in Møre og Romsdal
Giske
Buildings and structures in Ålesund
1987 establishments in Norway
Tunnels completed in 1987
Former toll tunnels